Jon Monday (born 1947 in San Jose, California) is an American producer and distributor of CDs and DVDs across an eclectic range of material such as Swami Prabhavananda, Aldous Huxley, Christopher Isherwood, Huston Smith, Chalmers Johnson, and Charles Bukowski. Monday directed and co-produced with Jennifer Douglas the feature-length documentary Save KLSD: Media Consolidation and Local Radio. He is also President of Benchmark Recordings, which owns and distributes the early catalog of The Fabulous Thunderbirds CDs and a live recording of Mike Bloomfield.

Career

Monday got his start in multimedia through his own psychedelic light-show company in the Bay Area in 1967, providing visuals for concerts by Country Joe and the Fish, Janis Joplin's Big Brother and the Holding Company, Quicksilver Messenger Service, and Steve Miller's Blues Band at local Berkeley, California venues and The Fillmore in San Francisco.

In 1970, Monday was hired by John Fahey at Takoma Records in Santa Monica, as their first full-time employee, becoming promotion director in 1975, and later general manager. working with guitar artists such as Leo Kottke, John Fahey, Mike Bloomfield, and Peter Lang. Eventually, he became Takoma's Vice President and General Manager, and also provided art direction, engineering, and/or produced albums by such artists as George Winston, Norman Blake, Peter Rowan, Jim Kweskin, Maria Muldaur, Loudon Wainwright III, and Joseph Byrd.

In 1979, Fahey sold Takoma Records to a new company formed by music business attorney Bill Coben, veteran producer/manager Denny Bruce, and Chrysalis Records. Monday continued with the new company as General Manager. During that time, Takoma signed and released albums by The Fabulous Thunderbirds, Canned Heat, and T-Bone Burnett.

In 1982, Monday was appointed sales manager for Chrysalis Visual Programming Division, headquartered in Los Angeles. Eventually Monday was brought into Chrysalis Records as its Director of Marketing, working with Blondie, Jethro Tull, Huey Lewis, Pat Benatar, Billy Idol, and Toni Basil.

In 1984, Monday relocated to Silicon Valley and had a 2nd career as an executive in various software and high-tech companies. He also held senior management positions or consulted with major 3rd party video game publishers, such as Epyx, Eidos Interactive, and Capcom. He was also Vice President of PlayNet, working directly with Atari founder Nolan Bushnell.

Monday was co-founder (with music research pioneer Larry Heller) and president of MusicWriter Inc., a Californian company that developed the NoteStation, a point-of-sale kiosk for printing sheet music, in any key, for sale to customers in music stores. In addition to printing sheet music, the NoteStation was able to produce MIDI disks containing selected music. In 1994, NoteStation kiosks were in 175 stores in the United States, Canada and the United Kingdom.

Monday retired and moved to the San Diego area in 2004 and launched two labels: mondayMEDIA and GemsTone; producing, directing, and distributing original and archival material.

In 2006 Monday brought together many notable recording artists and produced The Revenge of Blind Joe Death: The John Fahey Tribute Album, which was released on the Takoma Records label, distributed by Fantasy Records. Participating artists included, George Winston, Michael Gulezian, Alex de Grassi, Country Joe McDonald, Peter Lang, Stefan Grossman, Rick Ruskin, and Canned Fish (a one-time collaboration between Canned Heat members Adolfo de la Parra ("Fito") and Larry Taylor, and Country Joe and the Fish member Barry "The Fish" Melton).

In 2008 Monday was asked by Bill Coben and Denny Bruce, founders of Benchmark Recordings, to join as President and run the label. The company has titles by The Fabulous Thunderbirds and Mike Bloomfield

In 2012 Monday released the feature-length documentary Save KLSD: Media Consolidation and Radio and is currently working on an authorized biographical documentary about the life, career, and impact of world religions scholar Huston Smith.

Published articles
Elizabeth Cotton: Folk Guitar Legend, Guitar Player, March 1975
A Personal Lesson About the End of Time, The Vedanta Kesari, India, December 1993
A Personal Lesson About the End of Time, Vedanta for East and West, UK, January / February 1994
For the Historic Record, American Vedantist, US Vol. 3, no. 3, Fall 1997.
I Saw Swamiji on TV Last Night, American Vedantist, US, Summer 1998
The Limitations of Mental Models Vedanta, UK, November / December 2002
The Limitations of Mental Models The Vedanta Kesari, India, April 2003
The Gospel of Chomsky, Vedanta, UK, January / February 2005 
Broken Pot, a Haiku Poem, American Vedantist, US, October 2013 
J.D. Salinger & Vedanta, American Vedantist, US, January 2014 - co-written with Anna Monday 
Christopher Isherwood and Vedanta, American Vedantist, US, Winter 2014/2015 - co-written with Anna Monday 
The History and Impact of the Swami Prabhavananda – Christopher Isherwood Bhagavad Gita Translation, American Vedantist, US, Spring 2018

Political activism

Jon Monday enlisted in the army in March 1965. After completing his basic training and courses in advanced electronics, he volunteered to become a paratrooper and was assigned to the 82nd Airborne Division.

As the Vietnam war escalated, Monday turned his attention to becoming a Conscientious Objector, feeling that the war did not reflect the high ideals of America and America's democracy. He refused to participate in the war and eventually he was given a court martial, at which he pointed out that the Nuremberg Trials of Nazi war criminals, had established the right and duty of soldiers to object to wars they felt to be illegal and immoral. Monday spent a year in jail and was given a Bad Conduct Discharge. In 1975 Monday was given a full pardon by President Ford, his discharge was changed to a Clemency Discharge, and was awarded a Certificate of Completion by the Selective Service, showing he had fulfilled his duty to his country.

After the start of the Iraq War, Monday joined Veterans For Peace and became active in the San Diego Chapter, giving talks to local colleges, organizing Arlington West memorials, and speaking at anti-war rallies.

In 2004 Monday also became involved with the Fallbrook Democratic Club, becoming a board member and in 2008 was its President. In 2011 he was reelected to the FDC's board as Vice President for the 2012 term].

Credits
1973 - George Winston, Piano Solos, LP - Takoma Records, Art Director
1974 - John Fahey, Fare Forward Voyagers (Soldier's Choice), CD - Takoma Records, Art Director
1975 - Joseph Byrd, Yankee Transcendoodle, LP - Takoma Records, Co-producer
1975 - Joseph Byrd, A Christmas Yet to Come, LP - Takoma Records, Co-producer
1976 - The American Music Consort, Sentimental Songs of the Mid-19th Century, LP Takoma Records, Co-producer
1976 - Various Artists, The Walnut Valley Spring Thing, LP Takoma Records, Co-producer
1976 - Christopher Isherwood, Selections from the Upanishads, CD - GemsTone, Co-producer
1976 - Norman Blake, Live at McCabes, CD - Takoma Records, Art Director
1977 - Larry McNeely, Larry McNeely with Jack Skinner and Geoff Levin, LP Takoma Records, Art Direction
1978 - Peter Rowan, Peter Rowan, CD Flying Fish Records, Engineer
1979 - Loudon Wainwright III, A Live One, CD - Rounder Records, Engineer
1979 - Jim Kweskin, Side by Side, CD - Mountain Railroad Records, Engineer
1980 - Maria Muldaur, Gospel Nights, CD - Takoma Records, Co-producer
2004 - Christopher Isherwood, Lecture on Girish Ghosh, CD - GemsTone, Producer
2005 - Huston Smith and Phil Cousineau, The Roots of Fundamentalism, DVD - GemsTone, Producer/Director
2005 - Samoan Cultural Preservation Project, The Music of Samoa, CD - GemsTone, Co-Producer/Engineer
2006 - Esalen Institute, Envisioning the Future: From Spirit to Social Action, DVD - with Ken Dychtwald, Joanne Shenandoah, Doug George-Kanentiio, Phil Cousineau, Robert Reich, and Huston Smith, Producer/Director
2006 - Chalmers Johnson, Evil Empire: A Talk by Chalmers Johnson, DVD - mondayMEDIA, Producer/Director
2006 - Various Artists, The Revenge of Blind Joe Death: The John Fahey Tribute Album, CD - Takoma/Fantasy, Producer
2007 - Esalen Institute, A Time for Solutions, DVD - with Ken Dychtwald, John Cleese, Deepak Chopra, Robert Reich, Mollie Katzen, Michael Murphy, Jay Alexander, and Kathy Smith, Producer/Director
2008 - Charles Bukowski, There's Gonna Be a God Damn Riot in Here, DVD - mondayMEDIA, Producer
2008 - Charles Bukowski, The Last Straw, DVD - mondayMEDIA, Producer/Director
2008 - Esalen Institute, The Way Forward, DVD - with Ken Dychtwald, Amory Lovins, Robert Reich, Sam Keen, Chungliang Al Huang, Anna Halprin, Michael Murphy, Joseph Montville, Patricia de Jong, and Anisa Mehdt, Producer/Director
2009 - Esalen Institute, Vision & Visionaries: The Alchemy of Transformation, DVD - with Ken Dychtwald, Robert Reich, Bob Herbert, Isabel Allende, Michael Krasny, Nina Simons, Kenny Ausubel, Akuyoe Graham, Greg Hodge, and Michael Murphy, Producer/Director
2010 - Charles Bukowski, One Tough Mother, DVD - mondayMEDIA, Co-producer/Director
2010 - Esalen Institute, Living a Purposeful Life, DVD - with Ken Dychtwald, Robert Reich, Eric Schlosser, Chungliang Al Huang, David Darling, Richard Tarnas, Jeffery Kripal, and Michael Murphy, Producer/Director
2011 - The Fabulous Thunderbirds, The Best of the Fabulous Thunderbirds: Early Birds Special, CD - Benchmark Recordings, Co-producer
2011 – Esalen Institute, Connections: The Elixer of Life, DVD – with Ken Dychtwald, Michael Murphy, Gordon Wheeler, Tricia McEntee, Sam Yau, Michael Krasney, Dani Shapiro, Akuyoe Graham, Van Jones, and Maddy Dychtwald
2012 - Huston Smith, The Arc of Life: Huston Smith on Life, Death & Beyond with Ken Dychtwald, DVD - mondayMEDIA - Director and Producer
2012 - Save KLSD: Media Consolidation and Local Radio, DVD - with Bill Moyers, Robert Reich, Van Jones, Phil Donahue, Ed Schultz, David Shuster, Cenk Uygur, Amy Goodman, Thom Hartmann, Stacy Taylor, John Nichols, Richard Wolffe, Randi Rhodes, Congressman Bob Filner, Jon Adelstein, Robert McChesney, Bob Edgar, Mike Aguirre, Marjorie Cohn, Michael Krasny, J.W. August, Andrew Donohue, Marti Emerald, and Eric Klinenberg - mondayMEDIA - Co-producer and Director|

References

External links
mondayMEDIA Official site
About Jon Monday Page
[ List of Music Production Credits in All Music Guide]
[ Jon Monday Biography on All Music Guide]
Interview with Jon Monday in Blues GR

Record producers from California
1947 births
People from San Jose, California
Living people